Xenotoca is a genus of fish in the family Goodeidae from Mexico, where found in a wide range of habitats, from rivers and creeks to pools and lakes, in the Lerma–Grande de Santiago, Panuco, Cuitzeo and other basins of the Mesa Central. While no goodeid is a very common aquarium fish, the redtail splitfin (X. eiseni), is one of the most common aquarium goodeids. Its relatively  bright colors offset its reputation for being aggressive towards tankmates, occasionally even killing them. Similarly to that species, two species described in 2016 have males with red-orange tails, but this feature is not shared by the remaining members of the genus.

Species

There are currently five recognized species in this genus, but two possibly undescribed species, tentatively referred to as Xenotoca cf. melanosoma and Xenotoca cf. variata, are known.

Genetic work has shown that the genus, as currently defined, is not monophyletic: The type species X. variata is distantly related to the remaining, which eventually will be reallocated to their own genus.

 Xenotoca doadrioi Domínguez-Domínguez, Bernal-Zuñiga & Piller, 2016
 Xenotoca eiseni (Rutter, 1896) (Redtail splitfin)
 Xenotoca lyonsi Domínguez-Domínguez, Bernal-Zuñiga & Piller, 2016
 Xenotoca melanosoma Fitzsimons, 1972 (Black splitfin)
 Xenotoca variata (T. H. Bean, 1887) (Jeweled splitfin)

References

Endemic fish of Mexico
Freshwater fish genera
Freshwater fish of Mexico
Goodeinae
Taxa named by Carl Leavitt Hubbs
Ray-finned fish genera
Mexican Plateau